Theodore H. L. Bond (January 25, 1904 – December 18, 1997) was an American Negro league infielder between 1935 and 1940.

A native of Kimball, West Virginia, Bond attended Bluefield State College. He made his Negro leagues debut in 1935 with the Pittsburgh Crawfords, and played for the Chicago American Giants in 1937 and 1940. Bond died in Chicago, Illinois in 1997 at age 93.

References

External links
 and Seamheads

1904 births
1997 deaths
Chicago American Giants players
Pittsburgh Crawfords players
20th-century African-American sportspeople
Baseball infielders
People from Kimball, West Virginia
Bluefield State College alumni